Peggy Mast (born August 20, 1948) is a Republican politician who served as a member of the Kansas House of Representatives representing the 76th district. She served from 1997 to 2017, finishing her 20-year career as the Speaker of the House pro tempore.

Career 
Mast was previously a school bus driver, and worked for Emporia Zoo, Arnold Staffing Services, and Design Rite Contracting.

She has been a member of a number of organizations, including American Business Women's Association, Prairie Hens Unit, Kansas Cattlewoman's Association, Republican Women's Organization, and Alliance to Recognize and End Abuse.

Committee membership
Representative Mast served on the following legislative committees:
 Calendar and Printing
 Interstate Cooperation (vice-chair)
 Joint Committee on Kansas Security
 Legislative Budget
 Legislative Coordinating Council
 Legislative Post Audit Committee
 Social Services Budget (vice-chair)

Controversy

On October 20, 2016, she was widely criticized by peers and national news, by apparently praising a quote from Adolf Hitler while comparing him to Planned Parenthood. She said, "Great quote from Hitler in the video. Please listen to it closely. His words are profound! Let’s start using discernment."

References

Republican Party members of the Kansas House of Representatives
Living people
Women state legislators in Kansas
People from Emporia, Kansas
People from Norton, Kansas
Bus drivers
21st-century American politicians
1948 births
21st-century American women politicians